The 2019–20 Slovenian Football Cup was the 29th edition of the football knockout competition in Slovenia. The winners of the cup, Mura, earned a place in the first qualifying round of the 2020–21 UEFA Europa League. The tournament began on 14 August 2019 and ended on 24 June 2020 with the final.

Olimpija Ljubljana were the defending champions after winning the previous season's final, defeating Maribor with a score of 2–1.

Competition format

Qualified teams

2018–19 Slovenian PrvaLiga members
Aluminij
Celje
Domžale
Gorica
Krško
Maribor
Mura
Olimpija
Rudar Velenje
Triglav Kranj

Qualified through MNZ Regional Cups
2018–19 MNZ Celje Cup: Šampion and Brežice 1919
2018–19 MNZ Koper Cup: Koper and Tabor Sežana
2018–19 MNZG-Kranj Cup: Bled and Šenčur
2018–19 MNZ Lendava Cup: Odranci and Nafta 1903
2018–19 MNZ Ljubljana Cup: Radomlje and Bravo
2018–19 MNZ Maribor Cup: Pesnica and Dobrovce
2018–19 MNZ Murska Sobota Cup: Grad and Beltinci
2018–19 MNZ Nova Gorica Cup: Tolmin and Brda
2018–19 MNZ Ptuj Cup: Videm and Bistrica

First round
Twelve first round matches were played on 14–15 August 2019.

Round of 16
Eight round of 16 matches were played on 11–19 September 2019.

Quarter-finals
Four quarter-final match-ups were played over two legs from 16 to 30 October 2019.

First leg

Second leg

Semi-finals
Two semi-final matches were played on 9 and 10 June 2020. The semi-final round was originally scheduled to be played over two legs, but due to the COVID-19 pandemic, it was decided that both matches would be played in a single leg format and on a neutral venue at the Brdo National Football Centre, the home of the Football Association of Slovenia.

Final
The final was originally scheduled for 20 May 2020.

See also
 2019–20 Slovenian PrvaLiga

References

External links
 UEFA

Slovenian Football Cup seasons
Cup
Slovenia
Slovenia, cup